The Manchester Caribbean Carnival has been held annually in Alexandra Park, Manchester  since 1971. The area of Moss Side was at that time home to many recent immigrants from Caribbean countries. 

The first carnival was held on 31 May 1971.  The different Caribbean islands had floats and flew their own flags, and they were joined by the police band, an Irish band, a Scottish band and many local white community groups. The parade went from the park and round the city centre.

More recently the carnival has been held in August in recognition of Emancipation Day.  The 50th carnival, in 2022, celebrated 60 years of Jamaican independence.

Manchester City Council is the main funder of the carnival.  There have been issues around the financial management of the event.

See Also
 Photo gallery of History of Manchester Caribbean Carnival.

References

Carnivals in the United Kingdom
Events in Manchester
Annual events in England
Afro-Caribbean culture in England